Robert Groom (23 March 1816 – 22 March 1891) was an English cricketer. Groom's batting style is unknown. He was born at Shoreditch, Middlesex.

Groom made two first-class appearances for Surrey in 1846, both against Kent, with the first match played at The Oval and the second at Preston Hall in Kent. Groom scored a total of 11 runs in his two matches, with a high score of 4.

He died at Bethnal Green, London on 22 March 1891.

References

External links
Robert Groom at ESPNcricinfo
Robert Groom at CricketArchive

1816 births
1891 deaths
People from Shoreditch
English cricketers
Surrey cricketers